Beryl Iris Brewin (10 September 1910 – 8 January 1999) was a New Zealand marine zoologist, specialising in ascidians (sea squirts).

Academic career 
Brewin was born 10 September 1910 to parents Lucy and Frank Brewin. She graduated from Auckland University College in 1931 with a Bachelor of Science in botany and zoology. This was followed by an MSc in botany in 1933.

Brewin, described as a 'live wire', worked at the University of Otago Department of Zoology from 1936 to 1963. She had reached senior lecturer level when she retired.

Brewin submitted her Doctor of Science thesis, consisting of 18 papers published between 1942 and 1957 to the University of New Zealand in 1958. According to GBIF, she named more than 80 species or genera from New Zealand and Australia.

In 1954, Brewin was the second woman to be appointed to the Council of the Royal Society Te Apārangi, after her colleague Marion Fyfe, also from the Department of Zoology at Otago. Brewin served four years on the council.

Brewin retired in 1963, and left nearly half a million dollars to the University of Otago in 1999, for the purposes of providing more comfortable accommodation for marine researchers at the Portobello marine laboratory. She also bequeathed $1 million for the purchase of a research vessel, the  RV Beryl Brewin in her honour.

In 2017, Brewin was selected as one of the Royal Society Te Apārangi's "150 women in 150 words", celebrating the contributions of women to knowledge in New Zealand.

Selected species named by Brewin 

 Leptoclinides marmoreus Brewin, 1956
 Synoicum herdmani Brewin, 1956
 Arnbackia novaezelandiae Brewin, 1950
 Aplidium maritimum Brewin, 1958
 Aplidium knoxi Brewin, 1956
 Alloeocarpa minuta Brewin, 1951
 Botryllus stewartensis Brewin, 1958
 Pseudodistoma opacum Brewin, 1950
 Pyura rugata Brewin, 1948
 Aplidium benhami Brewin, 1946
 Aplidium siphonum Brewin, 1956
 Pyura carnea Brewin, 1948
 Leptoclinides sluiteri Brewin, 1950
 Ritterella sigillinoides Brewin, 1958
 Aplidium powelli Brewin, 1958
 Amaroucium maritimum Brewin, 1958
 Distaplia taylori Brewin, 1950

Selected works

References

External links 

Species named by Brewin (listed at the Global Biodiversity Information Facility)
Specimens collected by Brewin, listed on Bionomia

1910 births
1999 deaths
New Zealand women academics
University of Auckland alumni
Academic staff of the University of Otago
New Zealand marine biologists